Emiliano Tabone (born January 8, 1991) is an Argentine footballer currently playing for Unión Temuco of the Primera B Chilena. He was born in Buenos Aires, Argentina.

Teams
  Independiente (Inferiors) 2008-2009
  Tigre (Inferiors) 2010
  Unión Temuco 2011–present

External links
 

1991 births
Living people
Argentine people of Maltese descent
Argentine footballers
Argentine expatriate footballers
Club Atlético Independiente footballers
Unión Temuco footballers
Expatriate footballers in Chile
Association football forwards
Footballers from Buenos Aires